Erection is a 1971 short film by John Lennon with music by Yoko Ono.

Synopsis 
The 19-minute film is a time-lapse video of the construction of the London International Hotel (now the London Marriott Hotel Kensington) at 147 Cromwell Road, Kensington.  The film was made of photographs taken from a single point over a number of months in 1970 and 1971; Lennon sought permission to photograph the building's entire construction. The camera was fixed in place by Iain Macmillan, the photographer who captured the iconic 1969 Abbey Road album cover photograph. The footage was edited on 16 mm film by George Maciunas, founder of the Fluxus art movement and avant-garde contemporary of Ono.

The film uses the songs "Airmale" and "You" from Ono's 1971 album Fly, as its soundtrack.

When Lennon and Yoko appeared on the Dick Cavett Show on 11 September 1971, Lennon said that the inspiration for the film was when he would spend periods of time away from any particular city, he would return to find large buildings having been constructed.  He also outlines how the film shows a single bush showing the seasons passing.

References 

1971 films
British avant-garde and experimental films
Films shot in London
Films without speech
Works by John Lennon
Works by Yoko Ono
1971 short films
1970s avant-garde and experimental films
1971 documentary films
1970s British films